Mayabazar 2016 is a 2020 Indian Kannada language crime comedy film written and directed by debutant Radhakrishna Reddy, produced by Ashwini Puneeth Rajkumar of PRK Productions, M Govinda. The film stars Raj B. Shetty, Vasishta Simha, Achyuth Kumar, Prakash Raj and Chaithra Rao. The movie is about events surrounding the 2016 demonetization and revolves around an honest police officer, a small-time conman, a jobless youth and a corrupt cop who end up crossing each other's paths when they are in quest of money.

The film was theatrically released on 28 February 2020. The movie was remade in Tamil as Naanga Romba Busy.

Plot
The story is set in Bangalore, a few months before the demonetisation of 2016, and tells the story of three men from different walks of life to cope with the trials and tribulations of life before and after the note ban. Kubera is a small-time crook is in trouble with the law enforcement and resorts to conning people to pay off some corrupt cops and live peacefully. Joseph is an honest police officer who draws flak from everyone in the police department for not accepting bribes, however, his wife is a staunch supporter of his virtuous ways. His strong stance to never stoop to corruption puts him in a quandary when his wife is diagnosed with cancer, and he begins to contemplate ways of raising money for her surgery.

Providence puts Joseph into a position of power, where he is able to spy upon people possessing black money right after demonetisation occurs. With his wife's condition forcing his hand, Joseph concocts a plan to rob people of their ill-gotten gains, with Kubera posing as an income tax officer. On one such raid, the fake IT inspector notices Raji hiding in a house, who offers him a large sum of money in exchange for not apprehending him. However, Raji soon discovers that the IT officers are fake, and demands a cut from Joseph and Kubera after tailing them back to their hideout in exchange for his silence. Joseph is unhappy but reluctantly acquiesces to his demands.

It emerges that the money which Raji stole actually belonged to a highly ranked, violent cop Ashok Rao, who is furious upon discovery of the theft and embarks upon a quest to bring the thieves to justice. After Joseph realises this, he contemplates stopping further raids but is dissuaded from doing so by Kubera and Raji, who are greedy for more money. He agrees to plan and execute one final raid on Pataaki Pandu, a corrupt politician to raise the deficit amount for his wife's surgery. However, the plan goes awry, and Raji barely escapes with his life. This causes him to develop cold feet and quit the gang and Joseph too reneges on the plan. Joseph apologises to Ashok for stealing the money, who forgives him because of the dire circumstances which forced him to do so. The money for the surgery is raised through a trust fund, and Joseph's conscience is relaxed, as the burden of having stolen money is released from his head. Kubera decides to go ahead with the plan again, and this time Kubera hits pay dirt by unearthing a huge stack of black money Paandu possessed. However, he gets arrested by Ashok before he can escape with the money. Ashok boasts to have robbed several people this way, which is recorded by Raji, who had actually volunteered to assist Kubera remotely. Ashok is forced to let Kubera and Raji go scot-free, and they use the stolen money to flee the country and are shown relaxing on the beach in Bangkok.

Cast
 Raj B. Shetty as Kubera
 Vasishta Simha as Carpenter Raji 
 Achyuth Kumar as Joseph, a Police Inspector 
 Prakash Raj as ACP Ashok Rao
 Sudha Rani as Usha, Joseph's wife
 Chaithra Rao as Raaji's Girlfriend
 Sadhu Kokila as Pataki Paandu, Corporator
 Honnavalli Krishna as Constable Achar
 Huccha Venkat as Salesman
 Rockline Sudhakar 
 KB Pavan as Bank Officer 
 Puneeth Rajkumar in a Special Appearance "Loka Maya Bazaru" song
Shravan Aithal as Fake Income Tax officer

Production
Mayabazar 2016 is the second venture of PRK Productions. Shooting began on 24 January 2018 in Sri Kanteerava Studio.

The film is the joint production of Ashwini Puneeth Rajkumar and M Govindu who earlier made Doddmane Hudga starring Puneeth Rajakumar. Govindu liked the subject of debutant director Radhakrishna' story. Govindu went to seek the opinion of Puneeth Rajkumar. Puneeth Rajkumar expressed intention of jointly producing the film under his banner of PRK Productions. Costume designed by Upendra Shivu and Yogi G. Raj (Puneeth Rajkumar). Suresh Baganur has art director.

Soundtrack

Release
The official film trailer was released on 17 February 2020 on the 'PRK Audio' YouTube channel.

The film was released on 28 February 2020, and distributed by productions parent company Sri Vajreshwari Combines. The satellite rights of the film was taken by Star Suvarna. It was then released in the United States on 6 March, after successfully running in India, and on online video platform Amazon Prime on 3 April 2020.

Remake
The film was remade in Tamil as Naanga Romba Busy by Badri and will star Prasanna, Shaam, Ashwin Kakumanu, Yogi Babu, and Shruti Marathe.

Awards and nominations

References

External links
 

2020s Kannada-language films
2020 films
Films shot in Karnataka
Films shot in Bangkok
Indian nonlinear narrative films
Indian heist films
Indian crime comedy films
Films about kidnapping in India
2020s masala films
2020s heist films
2020s crime comedy films
2020 directorial debut films
Kannada films remade in other languages
2020 crime films
2020 comedy films